The Cannanes are an Australian indie pop band formed in Sydney in late 1984. In the band's 30-year plus history the lineup has regularly changed, with Stephen O'Neil and Frances Gibson the only constant members.

History
The original 1984 line-up of the band was Stephen O'Neil (vocals, guitar), Annabel Bleach (vocals), Michelle Cannane (guitar and percussion), Frances Gibson (bass), and David Nichols (drums). The band released their first single "Life"/"It's Hardly Worth It" in a limited edition of just 12 cassettes in 1985, followed the same year by a cassette album, The Cannanes Come Across with the Goods. The band's first vinyl release was the Bored Angry & Jealous EP in 1986, which was proclaimed "Single of this and any other week" by The Legend! writing in the NME. Bleach left in 1987; Susan Grigg joined briefly on violin, but she and Cannane left soon afterwards The band underwent several line-up changes over the years: Randall Lee (of Ashtray Boy) was a member of the group in 1987-88 during which time they recorded their debut album, The African Man's Tomato and two singles released simultaneously, "Cardboard" and "I Think the Weather's Affected Your Brain".

The Cannanes released their second album, A Love Affair With Nature in 1989, on their own label (or rather on no label at all), with O'Neil and Gibson now sharing vocal duties. They toured the United States for the first time in 1991, recording the Caveat Emptor album to coincide with it, although it was not released until 1993. Numerous other releases followed. Core additional members in the early 1990s included bassist/vocalists Gavin Butler (on the albums Arty Barbecue and Short Poppy Syndrome) and Francesca Bussey (on a self-titled album and a long EP, Tiny Frown). Nichols left in 1996 to form Driving Past with Gig Ryan, Andrew Withycombe and Mia Schoen; his immediate replacement was Ivor Moulds. O'Neil and Gibson remained constant members, returning in early 1998 with the It's a Fine Line Between Pleasure and Pain EP, and an album, Living the Dream, later that year.

In the 2000s, the band continued play occasional shows in Australia as well as numerous overseas tours in Europe, Japan, The United States and Mexico. They also collaborated with electronica artist Explosion Robinson on the Felicity and Electro 2000 EPs and Trouble Seemed So Far Away album, and also collaborated with Steward (aka Stewart Anderson of Boyracer) on the Communicating at an Unknown Rate album and the Felicity EP.

On 19 March 2013 a new EP Small Batch was released in the United States, and on 16 April the 7 track the Small Batch Remixes EP. In June the band returned to the United States as invited guests at the chickfactor zines''' 21st Festival and recording dates in Brooklyn & Flagstaff, AZ. On 5 July a new album, Howling at All Hours was released internationally on Melbourne-based label Chapter Music.McGovern, Kyle (2013) "Stream the Cannanes’ Brainy ‘A Bigger Splash,’ From DIY Icons’ First LP in Over a Decade", Spin, 12 June 2013. Retrieved 5 November 2016 This was followed by an East Coast Australian tour and the release of a single on new US label Emotional Response, before the year was out.

2015 saw a flurry of activity following the well received January 'Original Masters' re-issue of the Communicating at an Unknown Rate album including a West Coast U.S. tour as well as shows in New York and Berlin. In 2016 the band returned to Flagstaff to finish work on an as yet unreleased album as well as headlining the opening night of The San Francisco Pop Fest, and later in the year released and launched a 12" remastered Picture Disc version of their 2nd and to date most popular LP.

Discography

CassettesBen/The Postmans Whistle (1984), no labelLife/It's Hardly Worth It (1985), Happy PenisThe Cannanes Come across With the Goods Cassette album (1985)Happy Swing EP (1987), K - reissued (2013), All GoneI've seen it all (Rarities 2) (1989)Pictures EP (1993), no labelThe Cannanes (1996), Ajax

Singles
"Cardboard"/"Woe" 7" (1988)
"I Think the Weather's Affected Your Brain"/"Stories to be Kept Under Lock and Key" 7" (1988)
"Broken Bottles" (1992), Bi-Joopiter
"Miserable"/"William" 7" (2000), 555 Recordings
"Hit The Wall" (2013), Emotional Response (7" & Dig)

EPsBored Angry & Jealous (1986), Distant ViolinsNo One (1987), KStumpvision (1992), AjaxFrightening Thing (1994), KPrototype (1994), Little TeddySimple Question (1996), AjaxPrice You Pay (1996), H (split with Sleepy Township)It's a Fine Line Between Pleasure and Pain (1998), HarrietTiny Frown (1998), Yo-YoPopulation~Two (1998), Blackbean & Placenta (split with Timonium)Australian Tour (2000), Blackbean & PlacentaElectro 2000 (2000), Insound Tour SupportFelicity (2001), 555 (split with Steward & Explosion Robinson)Crank It Up! (2001), Blackbean & PlacentaGrassy Flat (2008), Dark Beloved CloudSmall Batch (2013), exro.fm/Lamingtone (6 Track CD, 12" & Dig)(with Stephen Hermann)Small Batch Remixes (2013), exro.fm (7 Track Digital only)

AlbumsThe African Man's Tomato (1987)A Love Affair With Nature (1989), no label (reissued 1990 on Feel Good All Over and in 1995 with additional tracks)Caveat Emptor (1993), Feel Good All OverShort Poppy Syndrome (1994), AjaxThe Cannanes (1996), AjaxLiving the Dream (2000), Chapter MusicCommunicating at an Unknown Rate (2000), 555/Yo-Yo Recordings (with Steward)Trouble Seemed So Far Away (2002), Slabco (US) & Lamingtone (Australia) (with Explosion Robinson)Howling at all Hours (2013), Chapter MusicA Love Affair With Nature (2016), Chapter Music (LP; (Picture Disc) remastered)

Compilations & live albumsWitchetty Pole (1993), Feel Good All Over (compilation of first EP and first album)Arty Barbecue'' (1998), Ajax (compilation of singles and b-sides and unreleased song recorded in 1996)

References

External links

The Cannanes at bandcamp
Official Cannanes YouTube Channel

Australian indie pop groups
Musical groups established in 1984